Grazzini Bay is an ice-filled coastal embayment, between Gentile Point and Fisher Point on the east side of the Darley Hills, in the Churchill Mountains of Antarctica. The bay opens to the Ross Ice Shelf. It was named by the Advisory Committee on Antarctic Names after Athos D. Grazzini, a cartographer and toponymic specialist on the National Geographic Magazine (NGM) staff from about 1950–70. This is one of several features in the Darley Hills that are named for NGM staff.

References

Bays of the Ross Dependency
Shackleton Coast